My Name Is Fame is a 2006 Hong Kong comedy-drama film starring Lau Ching-wan as a has-been actor and newcomer Huo Siyan as an aspiring actress and his apprentice.

The movie is considered by many as a humorous reflection of Lau's actual career, which is highly regarded but almost unrewarded (Lau has never won a Hong Kong Film Award before this film which won him the Best Actor award).

While it is often compared to the three A Star Is Born films, My Name Is Fame departs from many of Star's clichés, notably dispensing with the romance of the old man-young girl relationship and the destructive spiral of the old man's career. While the girl does go onto great success, the man does redeem himself of bad habits (getting sober, offering constructive instead of abrasive criticism) and returns to being a well-renowned actor. Due to their busy film schedules, they never have time to meet. But at the end, she presents a best supporting actor award for which he has been nominated.

Many famous actors and filmmakers make cameo appearances, notably Tony Leung Ka-fai, who plays himself and tells Lau's character to return to acting, saying that while good roles are difficult to find, perseverance will be rewarded.

Plot 
Poon Kar-Fai (Lau Ching-wan)  is an actor who was once in the lime light and ended up throwing it all away through arrogance.

Cast

Main cast
Lau Ching-wan as Poon Ka-fai
Huo Siyan as Faye Ng
Candice Yu as Qiqi
Wayne Lai as Wai
Kong Hon as Ka-fai's father
Leung San as Ka-fai's mother
Derek Tsang as Lok

Guest appearances

Actors
Tony Leung Ka-fai as himself
Ekin Cheng as himself
Fiona Sit as herself
Niki Chow as herself
Remus Choi as himself
Calvin Choi as himself
Edmund So as himself
Lau Dan as himself
Jo Kuk as herself
Ku Feng as himself

Directors
Ann Hui as herself
Gordon Chan as himself
Samson Chiu as himself
Stephen Tung as himself
Fruit Chan as himself
Vincent Chui as himself
Jamie Luk as himself
Matthew Tang as himself

Other cast
Elena Kong as Ms. Hung
Henry Fong as Marco
Tsui Na as Shopkeeper
To Ting-ho as Andy
Muk Sing as Photographer
Wai Wai as May
Law Yiu-fai as TV director
Four Tse as Gaffer
Almert Mak as Assistant director
Jimmy Wong as Assistant director
Jimmy Wong as Production manager
Julie Lau as Production manager
Keith Chan as Production manager
Lai Ka-ho as Production manager
Jin Hui as TV production assistant
Lau Ka-fai as Cinematographer

Awards and nominations

References

External links

Review
 My Name Is Fame at rottentomatoes.com

2006 films
2006 comedy-drama films
Hong Kong comedy-drama films
2000s Cantonese-language films
Films directed by Lawrence Ah Mon
Films about actors
Films set in Hong Kong
Films shot in Hong Kong
Films with screenplays by James Yuen
2006 comedy films
2006 drama films
2000s Hong Kong films